María Consuelo Porras Argueta (born August 23, 1953) is a Guatemalan lawyer. She served as Deputy Magistrate of the Constitutional Court since April 2016. She was appointed by President Jimmy Morales as the new Attorney General and Chief of the Public Prosecutor's Office to replace Thelma Aldana.

Porras' tenure has been criticized for its backsliding in the fight against corruption. 

Porras maintained a strained relationship with the Head of the Special Prosecutor's Office against Impunity, Juan Francisco Sandoval, finally dismissing him in July 2021. In September 2021 the US State Department announced that it had added Porras and 5 Salvadorian judges to a list of "undemocratic and corrupt" officials. According to the US State Department, Porras "actively undermined" the corruption investigations conducted by Sandoval and his team.

References

External links
 

1953 births
Living people
People from Chimaltenango Department
Guatemalan women judges
Attorneys general of Guatemala
Female justice ministers
Universidad de San Carlos de Guatemala alumni